Jill Margaret Black, Lady Black of Derwent,   (née Currie; born 1 June 1954) is a former Justice of the Supreme Court of the United Kingdom.

Family
She is the daughter of two medical doctors, James Irvine Currie and Margaret Yvonne Currie. She was educated at Penrhos College and read law at the University of Durham. She married David Charles Black in 1978. They had a son and a daughter.  After they were divorced in 2013, she married fellow Court of Appeal judge Sir Richard McCombe.

Career
She was called to the bar in 1976 at Inner Temple. She specialised in family law and became a Queen's Counsel in 1994 and was appointed a deputy High Court judge in 1996 and a Recorder in 1999.

She was appointed to the High Court on 1 October 1999, and received the customary appointment as a Dame Commander of the Order of the British Empire. She was assigned to the Family Division, and served as Family Division Liaison Judge to the Northern Circuit from 2000 to 2004. On 15 June 2010, Black became a Lady Justice of Appeal, and was appointed to the Privy Council.

In 2004, she became Chairman of the Judicial Studies Board's Family Committee. She continued in that role until her appointment to the Judicial Appointments Commission as a judicial member in 2008.

It was announced on 21 July 2017 that Lady Justice Black would become the second female judge of the Supreme Court of the United Kingdom, after Lady Hale. She took  office on 2 October 2017, choosing the judicial courtesy title of Lady Black of Derwent. On 30 October 2020 it was announced that Lady Black would retire as a Justice of the Supreme Court of the United Kingdom on 10 January 2021.

See also

List of Durham University people

References

1954 births
Living people
Alumni of Trevelyan College, Durham
English King's Counsel
Family Division judges
Dames Commander of the Order of the British Empire
Lady Justices of Appeal
Members of the Privy Council of the United Kingdom
Judges of the Supreme Court of the United Kingdom
English women judges
20th-century King's Counsel
20th-century English women
20th-century English people
Wives of knights